The 1927 Washington State Cougars football team was an American football team that represented Washington State College during the 1927 college football season. Head coach Babe Hollingbery led the team to a 1–3–1 mark in the PCC and 3–3–2 overall.

During the Homecoming tie against Palouse neighbor Idaho on Friday, November 11, Governor Roland Hartley presented a cougar cub to the WSC students. The cub was originally to be called "Governor Hartley," in honor of its donor. The governor gracefully declined and suggested the name "Butch," in honor of senior quarterback Herbert "Butch" Meeker of Spokane.

Schedule

References

Washington State
Washington State Cougars football seasons
Washington State Cougars football